Wantage railway station is a closed stone and brick built station located on Mill Street, Wantage in Oxfordshire on the Wantage Tramway line. The station closed fully in 1945 when Wantage Tramway ceased operations.

History
Formed in 1873 to link Wantage Road station with its terminus at Wantage the line was cheaply built parallel to what was then the Besselsleigh Turnpike, and now the A338.

The line was opened for goods on 1 October 1875, and to passengers on 11 October. The tramway junction was to the east of Wantage Road station; interchange passengers walked under the bridge to reach the tramway yard, where the westernmost siding (parallel to the road) was reserved for passenger tramcars.

For most of its operation the line was well used and profitable but the advent of popular road transport saw a steady decline in passengers and freight. The tramway closed to passengers on 1 August 1925, and to goods on 22 December 1945.

References

Disused railway stations in Oxfordshire
Railway stations in Great Britain opened in 1875
Railway stations in Great Britain closed in 1945
Wantage
Wantage Tramway